General elections were held in Tonga on 28 May 1954. An amended electoral law had been passed in 1951 to allow women to vote for the first time in the elections; however, a technical error in the legislation was discovered that meant the franchise could not be extended in time to take effect for the 1954 elections.

Electoral system
The Legislative Assembly had seven directly-elected members; three representing Tongatapu and nearby islands, two representing Haʻapai and two representing Vavaʻu and nearby islands. A further seven members were elected by the nobility based on the same constituencies, seven ministers (including the governors of Haʻapai and Vavaʻu) and a Speaker chosen by the monarch, Sālote Tupou III.

Results

References

1954 in Tonga
Tonga
Elections in Tonga
May 1954 events in Oceania